William Barton was Archdeacon of Totnes from 1415 until 1421.

References

Archdeacons of Totnes
14th-century English people
15th-century English people